The John Maynard Smith Prize is a prize given by the European Society for Evolutionary Biology on odd years to an outstanding young researcher.  It was first awarded in 1997 and is named after the evolutionary biologist John Maynard Smith (1920–2004).

List of winners
Source: European Society for Evolutionary Biology

See also

 List of biology awards

References

Biology awards
Awards established in 1997
European science and technology awards